Rudolf Hendel (born 21 September 1947) is a German judoka. He competed in the men's middleweight event at the 1972 Summer Olympics.

References

External links
 

1947 births
Living people
People from Rodewisch
German male judoka
Sportspeople from Saxony
Olympic judoka of East Germany
Judoka at the 1972 Summer Olympics
20th-century German people